The Stafford Mineral Springs and Stafford's Wells Hotel are the site of a historic mineral springs hotel resort property in Montgomery County, Mississippi. The property was built in 1890 by Dr. Thomas Washborn and was visited for its supposed curative properties. Prior to 1916 it had well houses, bath houses, guest cottages, a dance pavilion, and gambling hall. The springs were listed on the National Register of Historic Places on September 8, 2000.

See also
National Register of Historic Places listings in Mississippi

References

External links
Stafford's Wells Hotel photograph on Flickr (part of a series)

National Register of Historic Places in Montgomery County, Mississippi
Hotel buildings on the National Register of Historic Places in Mississippi
Springs of the United States
Buildings and structures completed in 1890